Locus is the debut studio album by American progressive, post-hardcore band, Satyr, released independently on February 21, 2021.

Track listing

Personnel
Michael "Soup" Campbell – scream vocals, guitar, production 
Janald "JD" Long – clean vocals, guitar
Calvin "Dolphin" Cox - bass guitar
Brody Taylor Smith – drums, percussion, production

Technical 
Corey Bautista – producer, mixing, engineering
Kris Crummett - mastering
Jason 'Slumberspeak" Gardinier - art direction

References

2020 debut albums